Peridela is a genus of moths in the family Geometridae. It belong to class of insect.

References

Geometridae